ZAF may refer to:
 Zinc Application Framework
 Zambian Air Force
 South Africa by ISO 3166-1 alpha-3 code
 Zhengzhou East railway station, China Railway telegraph code ZAF

Zaf may refer to:
 Zaf, Iran